The North Korea women's national under-18 basketball team is a national basketball team of North Korea, administered by the Amateur Basketball Association of DPR of Korea.
It represents the country in international under-18 (under age 18) women's basketball competitions.

See also

North Korea women's national basketball team

References

External links
 Archived records of North Korea team participations

Basketball in North Korea
Basketball teams in North Korea
Women's national under-18 basketball teams
Basketball